Sampo is a Finnish given name. It is also a surname. Notable people with the name include:

Josh Sampo, American mixed martial artist
 Peter V. Sampo, American founder of liberal arts colleges

Sampo Ala (born 2002), Finnish professional footballer
 Sampo Haapamäki, Finnish composer
Sampo Karjalainen (born 1977) is one of the original founders of Sulake and Habbo Hotel
Sampo Koskinen (born 1979), Finnish former professional footballer and coach
Sampo Marjomaa (born 1976), Finnish television personality and entertainer
 Sampo Ranta, Finnish ice hockey player
Sampo Terho, Finnish politician

Sampo, the protagonist of the 1860 fairy tale Sampo Lappelill by Finnish writer Zachris Topelius

See also

Finnish masculine given names